Paris, also known as Alexander (Aléxandros), the son of King Priam and Queen Hecuba of Troy, is a mythological nobleman that appears in a number of Greek legends. 

Of these appearances, probably the best known was the elopement with Helen, queen of Sparta, this being one of the immediate causes of the Trojan War. Later in the war, he fatally wounds Achilles in the heel with an arrow as foretold by Achilles's mother, Thetis. 

The name Paris is probably of Luwian origin, and comparable to  Pari-zitis, attested as a Hittite scribe's name. The name Paris is etymologically unrelated to the name of the French city of Paris, which derives its name from a Gaulish tribe called the Parisii.

Description 
Paris was described by the chronicler Malalas in his account of the Chronography as "  well-grown, sturdy, white, good nose, good eyes, black pupils, black hair, incipient beard, long-faced, heavy eyebrows, big mouth, charming, eloquent, agile, an accurate archer, cowardly, hedonist". Meanwhile, in the account of Dares the Phrygian, he was illustrated as ". . .fair, tall, and brave. His eyes were very beautiful, his hair soft and blond, his mouth charming, and his voice pleasant. He was swift, and eager to take command."

Family 
Paris and the nymph Oenone had a son Corythus. By Helen, he had Bunomus, Aganus ("gentle"), Idaeus and a daughter also called Helen.

Mythology

Childhood
Paris was a child of Priam and Hecuba (see the List of children of Priam). Just before his birth, his mother dreamed that she gave birth to a flaming torch. This dream was interpreted by the seer Aesacus as a foretelling of the downfall of Troy, and he declared that the child would be the ruin of his homeland. On the day of Paris's birth, it was further announced by Aesacus that the child born of a royal Trojan that day would have to be killed to spare the kingdom, being the child that would bring about the prophecy. Though Paris was indeed born before nightfall, he was spared by Priam. Hecuba was also unable to kill the child, despite the urging of the priestess of Apollo, one Herophile. Instead, Paris's father prevailed upon his chief herdsman, Agelaus, to remove the child and kill him. The herdsman, unable to use a weapon against the infant, left him exposed on Mount Ida, hoping he would perish there (cf. Oedipus). He was, however, suckled by a she-bear. Returning after nine days, Agelaus was astonished to find the child still alive and brought him home in a backpack (Greek pḗra, hence by folk etymology Paris’s name) to rear as his own. He returned to Priam bearing a dog's tongue as evidence of the deed's completion.

Paris's noble birth was betrayed by his outstanding beauty and intelligence. While still a child, he routed a gang of cattle-thieves and restored the animals they had stolen to the herd, thereby earning the surname Alexander ("protector of men"). It was at this time that Oenone became Paris's first lover. She was a nymph from Mount Ida in Phrygia. Her father was Cebren, a river-god or, according to other sources, she was the daughter of Oeneus. She was skilled in the arts of prophecy and medicine, which she had been taught by Rhea and Apollo, respectively. When Paris later left her for Helen, she told him that if he ever was wounded, he should come to her, for she could heal any injury, even the most serious wounds.

Paris's chief distraction at this time was to pit Agelaus's bulls against one another. One bull began to win these bouts consistently. Paris began to set it against rival herdsmen's own prize bulls and it defeated them all. Finally, Paris offered a golden crown to any bull that could defeat his champion. Ares responded to this challenge by transforming himself into a bull and easily winning the contest. Paris gave the crown to Ares without hesitation. It was this apparent honesty in judgment that prompted the gods of Olympus to have Paris arbitrate the divine contest between Hera, Aphrodite, and Athena.

Judgment of Paris

In celebration of the marriage of Peleus and Thetis, Lord Zeus, father of the Greek pantheon, hosted a banquet on Mount Olympus.  Every deity and demi-god had been invited, except Eris, the goddess of strife (no one wanted a troublemaker at a wedding).  For revenge, Eris threw the golden Apple of Discord inscribed with "tēi kallistēi" – "For the most beautiful" – into the party, provoking a squabble among the attendant goddesses over for whom it had been meant.

The goddesses thought to be the most beautiful were Hera, Athena, and Aphrodite, and each one claimed the apple. They started a quarrel so they asked Zeus to choose one of them. Knowing that choosing any of them would bring him the hatred of the other two, Zeus did not want to take part in the decision. He thus appointed Paris to select the most beautiful.

Escorted by Hermes, the three goddesses bathed in the spring of Mount Ida and approached Paris as he herded his cattle. Having been given permission by Zeus to set any conditions he saw fit, Paris required that the goddesses undress before him (alternatively, the goddesses themselves chose to disrobe to show all their beauty). Still, Paris could not decide, as all three were ideally beautiful, so the goddesses attempted to bribe him to choose among them. Hera offered ownership of all of Europe and Asia. Athena offered skill in battle, wisdom and the abilities of the greatest warriors. Aphrodite offered the love of the most beautiful woman on Earth: Helen of Sparta. Paris chose Aphrodite and therefore Helen.

Helen was already married to King Menelaus of Sparta (a fact Aphrodite neglected to mention), so Paris had to raid Menelaus's house to steal Helen from him—according to some accounts, she fell in love with Paris and left willingly.

The Spartans' expedition to retrieve Helen from Paris in Troy is the mythological basis of the Trojan War. This triggered the war because Helen was famous for her beauty throughout Achaea (ancient Greece), and had many suitors of extraordinary ability. Therefore, following Odysseus's advice, her father Tyndareus made all suitors promise to defend Helen's marriage to the man he chose for her.  When Paris took her to Troy, Menelaus invoked this oath.  Helen's other suitors—who between them represented the lion's share of Achaea's strength, wealth and military prowess—were obliged to help bring her back.  Thus, the whole of Greece moved against Troy in force and the Trojan War began.

Trojan War

Homer's Iliad casts Paris as unskilled and cowardly. Although Paris readily admits his shortcomings in battle, his brother Hector scolds and belittles him after he runs away from a duel with Menelaus that was to determine the end of the war. His preference for bow and arrow emphasizes this, since he does not follow the code of honor shared by the other heroes.

Early in the epic, Paris and Menelaus duel in an attempt to end the war without further bloodshed.  Menelaus easily defeats Paris, though Aphrodite spirits him away before Menelaus can finish the duel. Paris is returned to his bedchambers, where Aphrodite forces Helen to be with him.

Paris's second attempt at combat is equally fated: rather than engage the Greek hero Diomedes in hand-to-hand combat, Paris wounds Diomedes with an arrow through the foot.

Later, after slaying Hector and other heroes, Achilles dies by an arrow of Paris with Apollo's help. According to Hyginus (Fabulae, 107) Apollo disguised himself as Paris.

Later in the war, after Philoctetes mortally wounds Paris, Helen makes her way to Mount Ida where she begs Paris's first wife, the nymph Oenone, to heal him. Still bitter that Paris had spurned her for his birthright in the city and then forgotten her for Helen, Oenone refuses. Helen returns alone to Troy, where Paris dies later the same day. In another version, Paris himself, in great pain, visits Oenone to plead for healing but is refused and dies on the mountainside. When Oenone hears of his funeral, she runs to his funeral pyre and throws herself in its fire.

After Paris's death, his brother Deiphobus married Helen and was then killed by Menelaus in the sack of Troy.

Later treatments

 Jacques Offenbach, Henri Meilhac and Ludovic Halévy's 1864 operetta La belle Hélène tells a droll version of the seduction of Helen by Paris, who is the lead male role.
 The 1951 Swedish film Sköna Helena is an adapted version of Offenbach's operetta, starring Max Hansen and Eva Dahlbeck.
 In the 1956 film Helen of Troy, Paris, as the main character, is portrayed as a heroic character who at first worships peace and love but is later forced to take up arms against the treacherous Greeks.
 In prose he appears as the main character in Rudolf Hagelstange's 1959 book Spielball der Götter (Game of Gods).
 In the 1961 film Trojan Horse, Paris is played by Warner Bentivegna.
 In the 1962 film The Fury of Achilles, Paris is played by Roberto Risso.
 The Judgment of Paris and its aftermath are the subject of Michael Tippett's 1962 opera King Priam.
 In 1986 the song Crimes of Paris by Elvis Costello on his album Blood & Chocolate asks the question, "Who'll pay for the Crimes of Paris, who's gonna pay for the Crimes of Paris?"
 In Aaron Allston's 1993 novel Galatea in 2-D, a painting of Paris, brought to life, is used against a painting of Achilles brought to life.
 In the 2003 TV miniseries Helen of Troy, the character Paris, played by actor Matthew Marsden, is killed by Agamemnon.
 The story was also made into a 2003 musical, Paris, written by Jon English and David Mackay. Barry Humphries starred in the original performance as Sinon.
 In the 2004 Hollywood film Troy, the character Paris was played by actor Orlando Bloom. He is not killed by Philoctetes in this version, but leaves the falling city of Troy together with Helen and survives. Paris is portrayed as an irresponsible prince who put his romance before his family and country.
 The 2006 song "The Third Temptation of Paris" by Alesana tells the story of Helen and Paris from the viewpoint of Paris.
 In the Age of Empires: Definitive Edition, Paris featured as a cavalry unit.
 In the 2018 TV miniseries Troy: Fall of a City, Paris is portrayed by Louis Hunter.
 In the mobile game Fate/Grand Order, Paris appears as an Archer class Servant accompanied by Apollo.
 In the 2020 video game Total War Saga: Troy, Paris featured as an Epic Archer.

See also
 List of children of Priam
 Alaksandu of Wilusa, a 13th century BC Anatolian king who has been associated with Paris

Citations

General references 
 Graves, Robert, The Greek Myths, Harmondsworth, London, England, Penguin Books, 1960. 
 Graves, Robert, The Greek Myths: The Complete and Definitive Edition. Penguin Books Limited. 2017. 
 Homer, The Iliad with an English Translation by A.T. Murray, Ph.D. in two volumes. Cambridge, MA., Harvard University Press; London, William Heinemann, Ltd. 1924. Online version at the Perseus Digital xLibrary.
 Homer, Homeri Opera in five volumes. Oxford, Oxford University Press. 1920. Greek text available at the Perseus Digital Library.
 Parthenius, Love Romances translated by Sir Stephen Gaselee (1882-1943), S. Loeb Classical Library Volume 69. Cambridge, MA. Harvard University Press. 1916.  Online version at the Topos Text Project.
 Parthenius, Erotici Scriptores Graeci, Vol. 1. Rudolf Hercher. in aedibus B. G. Teubneri. Leipzig. 1858. Greek text available at the Perseus Digital Library.
 Quintus Smyrnaeus, The Fall of Troy translated by Way. A. S. Loeb Classical Library Volume 19. London: William Heinemann, 1913. Online version at theoi.com
 Quintus Smyrnaeus, The Fall of Troy. Arthur S. Way. London: William Heinemann; New York: G.P. Putnam's Sons. 1913. Greek text available at the Perseus Digital Library.

External links

 The Judgement of Paris by William Etty at the Lady Lever Art Gallery
 

Characters in the Aeneid
Characters in the Iliad
Children of Priam
Mythological Greek archers
Princes in Greek mythology
Trojan Leaders
Deeds of Aphrodite